Meet the Missus may refer to:

Meet the Missus (1929 film), an Al Christie production
Meet the Missus (1937 film), an American comedy directed by Joseph Santley
Meet the Missus (1940 film), an American comedy directed by Malcolm St. Clair